Marcelina Gonzales (born 1989) is an American visual artist from Brownsville, Texas. 

According to Gonzales, her work focuses on her identity as a young Chicana growing up in a neighborhood that is often marginalized and misunderstood.

Early life and education 
Gonzales states that much of her work is created to reflect and reconstruct her childhood and personal experiences in Brownsville.  She had trouble accepting and loving herself and, as a result, developed debilitating depression and anxiety. Gonzales says that she turned to art as a form of therapy which allowed her to pursue empowerment in regards to her gender and cultural identity.

Gonzales went on to study at the University of Texas at Brownsville and received a Bachelor of Arts in Visual Arts in 2013.After completing her bachelor's degree, her primary medium became resin collage. Some of her work takes the form of "puzzling-assemblages", a term she uses to refer to the fact that these pieces can become two-dimensional or three-dimensional depending on where her audience may stand.

Career 
Outside of art, Gonzales works at an agency that provides home health care coordination to elderly and disabled patients.

As an artist, Gonzales has exhibited her art throughout Texas, California, and New York as well as in Germany, Hungary, and Dubai. She uses her work to challenge the preconceptions of what it means to be Chicana and the social, political, economic, religious, and sexual role of women living in contemporary America. This can be seen in the GIRLS will be GIRLS: An All-Women Art Exhibition that she personally curated and in her Object collection. She has also used resin collages to create snapshots of her memories growing up in Brownsville which can be seen in her Valley Girl Collection.

Notable works 

 No Class Tomorrow, Bro! in Images of Power Exhibit, a digital piece that depicts the events that took place in Charlottesville, Virginia in 2017
Tiempo del Vals at Sunrise Mall in Between Two Worlds Exhibit and Valley Girl Collection. A piece that is oil tinted and resin collaged on wood that depicts a quinceñera and her court of honor. This piece can move from two dimensional to three dimensional. 
Let's see what that mouth can do! in GIRLS will be GIRLS: An All-Women Art Exhibition and Valley Girl collection

References

Further reading 
 El Retorno: El Valle Celebra Nuestra Gloria Anzaldúa Luncheon Symposium Catalogue Edinburg, TX, 2015
 Cure for the Blues, by Nancy Moyer, The Monitor, McAllen, TX, 2013

1989 births
Living people
21st-century American women artists
American people of Mexican descent
Artists from Texas
People from Brownsville, Texas
University of Texas alumni
Wikipedia Student Program